The Caller is a 2011 British and Puerto Rican supernatural horror film directed by Matthew Parkhill and written by Sergio Casci, starring Rachelle Lefevre, Stephen Moyer and Lorna Raver. The movie was filmed entirely in Puerto Rico. The Gala Premiere of the movie was on August 23, 2011 at Metro Cinema in Puerto Rico.

Plot
When troubled divorcee Mary Kee sets up home in her new apartment, she stumbles across an old telephone which she quickly falls in love with. Struck by its antique charm, she gives it a place of pride in her home. Before long, Mary begins to receive strange phone calls from a mysterious, unknown caller. Over time, she discovers that the caller is a woman named Rose, and the two strike up an unlikely friendship. However, when Rose claims to be calling from the past, Mary begins to question her new friend's motives.

As Rose's phone calls become ever more disturbing, Mary's sense of terror escalates. Feeling haunted in her own home, she cuts all contact with Rose. Enraged by Mary's absence, Rose threatens to exact her terrible revenge, not on Mary in the present but on Mary as a child in the past. Mary finally realizes that she will have to kill Rose in order to save herself. But how can she kill someone living in the past?

Cast

Production
Brittany Murphy was originally cast as Mary Kee, but left the production and was replaced by Rachelle Lefevre.

Awards

References

External links
 
Interview with Mathew Parkhill about The Caller at subtitledonline.com

2011 films
2011 horror films
Puerto Rican films
Films about domestic violence
Films set in apartment buildings
Films shot in Puerto Rico
2011 horror thriller films
British supernatural thriller films
Mariticide in fiction
2010s English-language films
2010s British films